Nyingchi, also known as Linzhi or Nyingtri, is a prefecture-level city in the southeast of the Tibet Autonomous Region in China. The administrative seat of Nyingchi is Bayi District.

Nyingchi is the location of Buchu Monastery.

Economy

Tourism

The average elevation of Nyingchi is 3,040 meters (9,974 feet), which is the lowest compared with the other prefectures in Tibet. So, the risk of getting high-altitude sickness is relatively lower than other parts on the plateau.Guangdong province announced in 2012 that it plans to invest more than RMB 400 million (US$63 million) in Nyingchi's tourism industry. According to the plan, Guangdong will help build 22 "prosperous model villages" in Nyingchi in counties such as Bomê and Zayü.

Transportation 

It takes about 5 hours to travel from Lhasa to Nyingchi by a highway opened at the end of 2018. Nyingchi is connected to Lhasa by the 435-kilometer Lhasa–Nyingchi railway, completed in 2021. The journey from Lhasa by train takes 2.5 hours.

The Nyingchi Mainling Airport was opened in Nyingchi in March 2017, which may be used to support both commercial air traffic and the People's Liberation Army Air Force.

Climate
Köppen-Geiger climate classification system classifies its climate as subtropical highland (Cwb).

Flora and fauna 

"According to local forestry officials, Nyingchi hosts the country's largest primitive forest region that covers 26.4 billion cubic metres, storing over 800 million cubic metres of wood." The forests of Bomi, Zayu and Loyu have ancient dragon spruces which reach heights of over 80 metres and diameters of 2.5 metres. Wildlife species include "the Bengal tiger, leopard, bear, snub-nosed monkey, antelope and lesser panda."

"There are over 2,000 species of higher plants, including some 100 species of xylophyta, 165 species of medical herbs and fungus. Crops include "rice, peanut, apple, orange, banana, lemon." Agricultural products include medicinal materials, "edible fungus, orange, tangerine, sugar cane, honey peach, apple, pear, grape, walnut and other fruits."

Administrative subdivisions 
The two counties of Zayü and Mêdog, collectively known as part of South Tibet, are considered by the Chinese government to be under Chinese jurisdiction.

References

External links 
 Tibetinfor.com
 Nyingchi information and travel guides at Nyingchi.com

 
Prefecture-level divisions of Tibet